The 1994–95 season was the 115th season of competitive football by Rangers.

Overview 
Rangers played a total of 42 competitive matches during the 1994–95 season. The club won the Premier Division with a commanding sixteen point lead over nearest challengers Motherwell.

The cup competitions were not so successful as the side crashed out the Scottish Cup in the fourth round to Hearts, losing 4–2. In the League Cup the side was defeated 2–1 by Falkirk.

The European campaign was over as soon as it began, the club was knocked out the UEFA Champions League in the first round by AEK Athens, losing 3–0 on aggregate.

Rangers made three expensive signings at the start of the season in shape of defenders Basile Boli and Alan McLaren, as well as forward Brian Laudrup. On his way out of the club was striker Duncan Ferguson after 18 months, when in December 1994 he signed for Everton in a £4.3million deal after two months on loan in Merseyside, handing the Ibrox club a small profit on the then UK transfer record fee they originally paid for him.

The club's successful season was overshadowed by the death in March of club legend Davie Cooper at the age of 39.

Transfers

In

Out 

Expenditure:  £7,025,000
Income:  £6,150,000
Total loss/gain:  £875,000

Results 
All results are written with Rangers' score first.

Scottish Premier Division

UEFA Champions League

League Cup

Scottish Cup

Appearances

League table

See also 
 1994–95 in Scottish football
Nine in a row

References 

Rangers F.C. seasons
Rangers
Scottish football championship-winning seasons